Vekerd is a village in Hajdú-Bihar County, in the Northern Great Plain region of eastern Hungary.

Geography

See also
 Regestrum Varadiense  (hu)

References

Populated places in Hajdú-Bihar County
Romanian communities in Hungary